Nicolás Blandi (born 13 January 1990) is an Argentine footballer who plays as a forward for San Lorenzo.

Club career

Early career
Born in Campana, Buenos Aires, Blandi began his career at the age of five at Escuela de Fútbol Infantil (EFI), a footballing school directed by Peter Ithurburu, as a central midfielder. In 2000, aged ten, he moved to Puerto Nuevo, representing the club for one year before joining Villa Dálmine.

In 2002, Blandi joined Chacarita Juniors' youth setup, now already a forward. He played for the side for three seasons before moving to Boca Juniors at the age of 15.

Boca Juniors
In May 2010, after impressing with the reserve team, Blandi was called up to the main squad ahead of a pre-season tour in the United States. He made his first-team debut on 24 May in a 1–0 loss at Los Angeles Galaxy, and scored his first goal five days later in a 3–2 defeat to Portland Timbers.

Loan to Argentinos Juniors
In July 2010, Blandi was loaned to fellow Primera División side Argentinos Juniors, for one year. He made his professional debut on 16 August, starting in a 1–1 away draw against Independiente.

Blandi scored his first professional goal on 14 November 2010, netting the game's only in a home success over San Lorenzo. He scored six goals in 25 appearances for the club.

Return to Boca
Returning to Boca ahead the 2011–12 campaign, Blandi was initially listed for loan by manager Julio César Falcioni, but remained in the squad after impressing during the pre-season. He made his official debut for the club on 23 September 2011, in a 1–0 home win against Estudiantes.

Blandi scored his first official goals for the club on 26 October 2011, netting a brace in a 2–0 away success over Colón. He was regularly used during the season, mainly as a backup to Pablo Mouche and Darío Cvitanich, and beat off competition from Orlando Gaona Lugo, Sergio Araujo and injured Lucas Viatri.

Blandi continued to feature mainly as a backup option in the following seasons.

San Lorenzo
On 13 January 2014, Blandi joined San Lorenzo on three-year contract, for a fee of US$ 1.8 million for 50% of his federative rights. He made his debut for the club on 8 February in a 1–0 away loss against Olimpo, and scored his first goal eight days later in a 1–0 home defeat of Racing Club.

He was a part of the squad who lifted the 2014 Copa Libertadores, acting mainly as a rotation option with Mauro Matos and Martín Cauteruccio.

Loan to Evian TG
On 17 January 2015, Blandi was loaned to Ligue 1 side Evian Thonon Gaillard for six months. After struggling with an injury in his first two months, he made his debut for the club on 21 March by replacing Mathieu Duhamel in a 1–0 home win against Montpellier HSC.

Blandi scored his first goal abroad on 18 April 2015, netting the equalizer in a 1–1 away draw against EA Guingamp. He contributed with six appearances during his spell, as his side suffered relegation.

Return from loan
Upon returning Blandi remained as a backup during the remainder of the 2015 season, but was a regular starter during the 2016 campaign. He scored eight goals during the latter year, including braces against Olimpo and River Plate.

On 1 August 2016, San Lorenzo bought the remaining 50% rights of Blandi.

Career statistics

Honours
Boca Juniors
Primera División: 2011 Apertura

San Lorenzo
Copa Libertadores: 2014
Supercopa Argentina: 2015

References

External links
 
 
 

1990 births
Living people
People from Campana, Buenos Aires
Sportspeople from Buenos Aires Province
Argentine footballers
Association football forwards
Boca Juniors footballers
Argentinos Juniors footballers
San Lorenzo de Almagro footballers
Thonon Evian Grand Genève F.C. players
Colo-Colo footballers
Unión de Santa Fe footballers
Argentine Primera División players
Ligue 1 players
Chilean Primera División players
Argentine people of Italian descent
Argentine expatriate footballers
Expatriate footballers in France
Expatriate footballers in Chile
Argentine expatriate sportspeople in France
Argentine expatriate sportspeople in Chile